The 1969 Lafayette Leopards football team was an American football team that represented Lafayette College during the 1969 NCAA College Division football season. Lafayette placed sixth in the Middle Atlantic Conference, University Division, and finished last in the Middle Three Conference.

In their third year under head coach Harry Gamble, the Leopards compiled a 4–6 record. Robert Zimmers and Gary Kolarik were the team captains.

In conference play, Lafayette's 1–3 record against MAC University Division opponents was the third-worst in the eight-team circuit, half a game behind Temple (1–2–1). Lafayette lost to both of its Middle Three rivals, Rutgers and conference champion Lehigh.

Lafayette played its home games at Fisher Field on College Hill in Easton, Pennsylvania.

Schedule

References

Lafayette
Lafayette
Lafayette Leopards football seasons
Lafayette Leopards football